Barry Rogerson (born 25 July 1936) was the first Bishop of Wolverhampton from 1979 to 1985 and, from then until his retirement in 2002, the Bishop of Bristol. He holds Honorary degrees from Bristol & the West of England Universities. He was made a Freeman of the City and County of Bristol in 2003.

Career

Rogerson was educated at the University of Leeds and Wells Theological College. Initially a bank employee, he was ordained in 1962, after which he held curacies at St Hilda's South Shields and St Nicholas’ Bishopwearmouth. From 1967 to 1975 he was a lecturer at Lichfield Theological College and then Salisbury and Wells Theological College, after which he became Vicar and subsequently Team Rector of St Thomas' Church, Wednesfield—a post he held until his ordination to the episcopate.

In 1978 he was seconded for six months to the Anglican Church of Melanesia to teach at the Bishop Patteson Theological College at Kohimarama in the Solomon Islands. He served as Chairman of the Melanesian Mission in England until his retirement in 2002.

Rogerson was elected as a Suffragan Bishop to the General Synod of the Church of England and House of Bishops in 1982. During his membership of the General Synod he was chairman of the Interfaith Consultancy Group (IFCOG) and continued to be a member of the advisory board of Ministry, ultimately becoming its chairman.  During his latter years on the Board he was instrumental in encouraging the Church of England to take the Distinctive Diaconate seriously, introducing the report For Such A Time as This to the General Synod in 2001.

Ecumenism
Starting as Chairman of Churches Together in Wolverhampton, Rogerson became a member of the World Council of Churches' Faith and Order Commission in 1987, and in 1991 a member of its Central Committee, a role which he held until his retirement. In 1997 he became a member of Churches Together in Britain and Ireland (CTBI) subsequently becoming one of its president. His final contribution was to co-chair with the Reverend. Dr. John B. Taylor the committee which produced the Report The Anglican-Methodist Conversations in 2001.

Ordination of Women
Rogerson has been a supporter of the ordination of women to the priesthood since his days as a student at Leeds University. Alongside John Oliver, then Bishop of Hereford, he was a consultant to The Movement for the Ordination of Women. He ordained the first 32 female priests in the Church of England on 12 March 1994 at his cathedral in Bristol.

In retirement he continues to serve as an honorary assistant bishop in the Diocese of Bath and Wells as well as being a governor of the University of the West of England.

Publications
 "Growing Together - Anglican Identity and European Ecumenism", in 2020 Visions, SPCK, 1992
 "Turn to God - Rejoice in Hope Taking Responsibility for Ourselves", in The Ecumenical Review, WCC, 1998
 "The diaconate: Taking the Ecumenical Opportunity", in Community-Unity-Communion, Church House Publishing, 1998
 "Financing the Ministry and Mission of the Church of England", in Evangelische Theologie, 1–2000
 "A Translation of the Church of Norway's Ordination Rites", in Studia Liturgica Vol:31(2) 2001

References

1936 births
Alumni of the University of Leeds
Bishops of Wolverhampton
Bishops of Bristol
Living people
People associated with the University of the West of England, Bristol
Alumni of Wells Theological College
Staff of Lichfield Theological College
20th-century Church of England bishops